Cnemidophorus ruthveni is a species of teiid lizard endemic to Bonaire and commonly known as the Bonaire whiptail. It was formerly considered a subspecies of Cnemidophorus murinus, commonly known as Laurent's whiptail, but that name is now restricted to the form found on the island of Curacao.

References

ruthveni
Reptiles of the Caribbean
Endemic fauna of Bonaire
Fauna of Bonaire
Reptiles described in 1935
Taxa named by Charles Earle Burt